The 1963–64 Macedonian Republic League was the 21st since its establishment. Bregalnica Štip won their first championship title.

Participating teams

Final table

External links
SportSport.ba
Football Federation of Macedonia 

Macedonian Football League seasons
Yugo
3